Saint-Hubert is a commune in the Moselle department in Grand Est in north-eastern France.

Rabas
Rabas is neither a village nor a hamlet, but an area located between the hamlet of Befey and the village of Saint-Hubert (all located on the territory of the commune).

As the legend says: "Charlemagne and group of hunters was following a deer in the forest. It was a very hot day and the people were very thirsty. Charlemagne makes the wish then build a church if Jesus came to help. Suddenly, under the feet of its horse spouts out a fresh and limpid source".

The first memory of the chapel is from 806. In 1049, the Pope Leo IX would have come to devote the church.

In 1884 the reconstruction of the chapel started by Abbé Cazin and Vicomte de Coetlosquet offered three windows for the chapel. And it acquired its current form.

Today, there is a new small church in the middle of the forest. Every year, on the Monday of Pentecost, many pilgrims visit the famous chapel.

See also
 Communes of the Moselle department

References

External links
 

Sainthubert